Stefan Jansen (born 4 July 1972) is a Dutch former professional footballer who played as a forward

He started his professional career in the 1990-1991 season for Roda JC. Later on he played for FC Den Bosch, Cambuur Leeuwarden, Salernitana, Ischia Isolaverde, TOP Oss, NEC Nijmegen, FC Den Bosch, SW Bregenz and FC Zwolle.

References
  VI Profile

1972 births
Living people
Dutch footballers
Association football forwards
Roda JC Kerkrade players
FC Den Bosch players
SC Cambuur players
NEC Nijmegen players
PEC Zwolle players
U.S. Salernitana 1919 players
SW Bregenz players
Eredivisie players
Eerste Divisie players
Serie B players
Austrian Football Bundesliga players
People from Veghel
Dutch expatriate footballers
Expatriate footballers in Italy
Expatriate footballers in Austria
S.S. Ischia Isolaverde players
Footballers from North Brabant
Dutch expatriate sportspeople in Italy
Dutch expatriate sportspeople in Austria